Live Phish Vol. 14 was recorded live at the Rosemont Horizon (now the Allstate Arena) in Rosemont, Illinois, near Chicago, on Halloween night, 1995.

It marks the second of five Halloween shows in which Phish dressed up in a "musical costume" by performing an album from another artist in its entirety. The band, along with a horn section, unveiled a complete performance of The Who's Quadrophenia, led by keyboardist Page McConnell, sandwiched in between two sets of Phish's own music. During their performance of "Harpua" Trey Anastasio told the story of Jimmy listening to his favorite album, which happened to be "the very same album that Phish was playing as their Halloween album at Rosemont Horizon that night." At this point they broke into a brief segment of "Beat It" by Michael Jackson, which led to fans believing they were going to play Thriller. They also played a loop of "Wanna Be Startin' Somethin'" over the PA at the beginning of set two before the ocean sounds of "I Am the Sea" overtook it. At the end of the show, the band encored with "My Generation" and destroyed their instruments just like The Who had done thirty years earlier.

Track listing

Disc one
Set one:
"Icculus" (Anastasio, Marshall) – 4:22
"The Divided Sky" (Anastasio) – 15:07
"Wilson" (Anastasio, Marshall, Woolf) – 4:41
"Ya Mar" (Ferguson) – 8:16
"Sparkle" (Anastasio, Marshall) – 3:45
"Free" (Anastasio, Marshall) – 9:39
"Guyute" (Anastasio, Marshall) – 10:38

Disc two
Set one, continued:
"Run Like an Antelope" (Anastasio, Marshall, Pollak) – 12:51
"Harpua" (Anastasio, Fishman) – 14:17
Set two:
"I Am the Sea" (Townshend) – 3:28
"The Real Me" (Townshend) – 3:22
"Quadrophenia" (Townshend) – 6:08
"Cut My Hair" (Townshend) – 3:49
"The Punk and the Godfather" (Townshend) – 4:54
"I'm One" (Townshend) – 3:12

Disc three
Set two, continued:
"The Dirty Jobs" (Townshend) – 5:45
"Helpless Dancer" (Townshend) – 2:20
"Is It in My Head" (Townshend) – 3:37
"I've Had Enough" (Townshend) – 5:47
"5:15" (Townshend) – 6:20
"Sea and Sand" (Townshend) – 3:30
"Drowned" (Townshend) – 4:58
"Bell Boy" (Townshend) – 4:32
"Doctor Jimmy" (Townshend) – 8:35
"The Rock" (Townshend) – 6:35
"Love, Reign O'er Me" (Townshend) – 6:37

Disc four
Set three:
"Audience Chess Move" – 2:28
"You Enjoy Myself" (Anastasio) – 40:33
"Jesus Just Left Chicago" (Beard, Gibbons, Hill) – 9:18
"A Day in the Life" (Lennon, McCartney) – 4:31
"Suzy Greenberg" (Anastasio, Pollak) – 8:30
Encore:
"My Generation" (Townshend) – 4:40

Personnel

Phish
Trey Anastasio – guitars, lead vocals, narration on "Harpua", acoustic guitar on "My Generation"
Page McConnell – piano, organ, backing vocals, lead vocals on "Cut My Hair", "The Punk Meets the Godfather", "The Dirty Jobs", "Is It In My Head?", "I've Had Enough", "Sea and Sand", "Doctor Jimmy" and "Jesus Just Left Chicago", co-lead vocals on "A Day in the Life", upright bass on "My Generation"
Mike Gordon – bass, backing vocals, narration on "Harpua", lead vocals on "Ya Mar" and "Drowned", banjo on "My Generation"
Jon Fishman – drums, backing vocals, lead vocals on "Love, Reign O'er Me"

Horn Section
Dave Grippo – Alto Saxophone 
Carl Gearhart – Trumpet 
Joey Somerville Jr. – Trumpet 
Chris Peterman – Tenor Saxophone 
Mike Hewitt – Baritone Saxophone 
Don Glasgo – Trombone, French Horn

Additional Personnel 
Leigh Fordham - co-lead vocals on "Bell Boy"

See also
Phish and their musical costumes

References

14
2002 live albums
Elektra Records live albums